Natural Insight is a cloud-based workforce management platform providing software to merchandisers, product companies, experiential marketers, event marketers, and retailers. Natural Insight is a subsidiary of Movista Inc. and headquartered in Ashburn, Virginia with offices in Toronto and Birmingham, England.

History 
Natural Insight is headquartered in Ashburn, Virginia, and was founded in 2004.  Among others, Natural Insight's current clients include MarketSource (an Allegis Group subsidiary), Godiva, Blackhawk_Network_Holdings, Nintendo, Hanes, and Kinney Drugs.  Since 2006, Natural Insight has been a member of the National Association for Retail Marketing Services.

References 

Software companies established in 2004